Toledo Botanical Garden (formerly the Crosby Gardens and George P. Crosby Park) is a botanical garden in Toledo, Ohio, owned and managed by Metroparks Toledo. 

Originally comprising  donated by George P. Crosby to the City of Toledo, the garden now encompasses . Notable events include the Crosby Festival of the Arts, held in late June; and Heralding the Holidays, a seasonal celebration showcasing the numerous resident artistic guilds.

History
Metroparks Toledo began assisting operations in 2006 after the city ceased its funding of the garden. Transfer of the park to Metroparks Toledo was formally transferred in 2019.

Notable gardens
 Susan H. LeCron Shade Garden (Including a noteworthy Hosta collection)
 Pioneer garden
 Herb garden
 Rose garden
 Perennial garden
 Green garden

Blair Lithophane Museum
In 2002 a collection of 2,300 Lithophanes that had been donated to the city of Toledo were used to establish a museum at the Toledo Botanical Gardens. The museum closed at the end of October 2019. The city agreed to relocate the museum by September 2020. As of January 2020, the museum had not confirmed future plans, beyond attempting to keep the collection in the city of Toledo.

Gallery

See also 
 List of botanical gardens in the United States
 North American Plant Collections Consortium

References

External links 
Official page
Park Map

Botanical gardens in Ohio
Tourist attractions in Toledo, Ohio
Parks in Toledo, Ohio
Metroparks Toledo
Protected areas of Lucas County, Ohio